8000 may refer to:

In general
 8000 (number)
 A.D. 8000, a year in the 8th millennium CE
 8000 BCE, a year in the 8th millennium BC
 A.D. 8000s, a decade, century, millennium of the 9th millennium CE
 8000s BCE, a decade, century, millennium of the 9th millennium BC

Products
 Beretta 8000, a handgun
 Delta 8000, space launch rocket
 Enfield 8000, an electric city car
 IBM 8000 mainframe computer

Other uses
 8000 Isaac Newton, an asteroid in the Asteroid Belt, the 8000th asteroid registered
 8000 (District of Mat), one of the postal codes in Albania
 Eight-thousander, a mountain over 8000 meters high

See also

 T-8000, a fictional character played by Arnold Schwarzenegger
 8000 Plus, a British microcomputer magazine
 8000 series (disambiguation) and 8000 class
 
 800 (disambiguation)
 80 (disambiguation)